is a Japanese footballer who plays midfielder for V-Varen Nagasaki in the J2 League.

Career
Akino made his debut for Kashiwa Reysol in the J. League Division 1 on 16 March 2013 against Vegalta Sendai in which he came on as an 87th-minute substitute for Kenta Kano as Reysol lost the match 2–1.

International
Akino was part of the Japanese u17 team that went to the 2011 FIFA U-17 World Cup. On 24 June 2011 in Japan's final group-stage match against Argentina U17's Akino scored the final goal for Japan in the 74th minute as Japan's under-17's went on to win the match 3–1 and top the group with seven points before going out in the quarter-finals to Brazil's under-17's.

Career statistics

Club
Updated to 18 February 2019.

References

External links
Profile at Shonan Bellmare
Profile at Kashiwa Reysol

1994 births
Living people
People from Inzai
Association football people from Chiba Prefecture
Japanese footballers
Japan youth international footballers
J1 League players
J2 League players
J3 League players
Kashiwa Reysol players
Shonan Bellmare players
V-Varen Nagasaki players
J.League U-22 Selection players
Footballers at the 2014 Asian Games
Association football midfielders
Asian Games competitors for Japan
21st-century Japanese people